Aber Falls is a waterfall located about two miles (3 km) south of the village of Abergwyngregyn, Gwynedd, Wales. 

History
Visitors walking along the main footpath towards the falls may spot several small Bronze Age settlements including an excavated roundhouse and smithy fenced off with an information plaque adorning it, several standing stones and cairns are also present, most of these sites can be found on the right side of the pathway. There is also a piece of recording equipment that is recording the weather. It is located to the north west of Snowdonia National Park in Wales.

Visitor facilities
There is a cash charge for parking but there are toilets and picnic benches available. The nearest place where food can be purchased is the cafe in the tourist information centre at  village.

It is possible to bathe in the plunge pool of the falls, although the water is cold even at the height of summer and care must be taken on the often slippery rocks.

North Wales Path
This bridge, together with the smaller one at the foot of the smaller falls to the west, was erected in 1995.

Gallery

References

Bibliography
 Gwynfor Evans (2001)  Abergwyngregyn.
 Gwynfor Evans (2002) Eternal Wales Abergwyngregyn

Novels
 Sharon Penman, Here Be Dragons
 Sharon Penman, The Reckoning
 Edith Pargeter, The Heaven Tree

Abergwyngregyn
Tourist attractions in Gwynedd
Waterfalls of Gwynedd
Waterfalls of Snowdonia